Aden is an unincorporated community in Hamilton County, Illinois, United States.

History
Aden was originally called Lower Hills. A post office was established at Lower Hills in 1875, and the post office was renamed Aden in 1894.

References

Unincorporated communities in Hamilton County, Illinois
Unincorporated communities in Illinois